Weyerbacher Brewing Company is a brewery in Easton, Pennsylvania, United States, founded in 1995 by Dan and Sue Weirback.  The brewery is well known for its "huge taste" beers.  Most of their brews are high in alcohol, with QUAD clocking in at 11.8% alcohol by volume, and a one-off 10th anniversary ale called Decadence brewed to 13% alcohol by volume.  Hops Infusion is one of the bitterest examples of the IPA style.  Weyerbacher is also a pioneer of aging beer in wooden barrels previously used for aging bourbon. This process was used to transform Old Heathen imperial stout into Heresy, Blithering Idiot barley wine into Insanity, Merry Monks Belgian tripel into Prophecy, and QUAD Belgian quadrupel into Blasphemy.  These four styles are all very high-alcohol brews with complex flavor profiles; the barrel-aging lends additional oak and whiskey flavors.  The results have been widely praised by fans of huge beers, though persons accustomed to more mainstream beer may find them an acquired taste.

In September 2008, Weyerbacher released a limited run of a seasonal India pale ale, marketed as Harvest Ale (6.2% ABV),that featured a first-year crop of freshly picked, Cascade and Nugget hops grown by the Weirbacks on their farm. The hops were used for flavoring, not to impart the signature bitterness in the beer.
 		
Dan Weirback has said the acre of hops were planted on a trial basis, as a response to a worldwide shortage of hops and price increases that suppliers informed brewers of in late 2007. As of November 2008, the brewery had plans to grow another crop and was exploring the availability of small-scale harvest equipment.

Weyerbacher sales have increased from $1.2 million in 2006 to $3.6 million in 2011.  As a result, brewing capacity was expanded from 10,000 to 30,000 barrels per year in 2012.

In April 2019, Weyerbacher sold a majority stake to a private Philadelphia based investing firm and filed for Chapter 11 bankruptcy. The Chapter 11 bankruptcy was part of the investment deal to restructure current debts. The company has named a new acting president Josh Lampe, who previously acted as the companies Chief Operating Officer, and is implementing ongoing strategies to drive the company forward.

References

External links
Weyerbacher home page

American beer brands
Beer brewing companies based in Pennsylvania
Companies that filed for Chapter 11 bankruptcy in 2019
Companies that filed for Chapter 11 bankruptcy in 2022